Mount Olympus is a mountain in the east central part of the island of Euboea, Greece. Its maximum elevation is 1,172 m. It is not the highest mountain of Euboea, that is 1,743 m high Dirfi, 16 km to the north. Olympus is 10 km north of Amarynthos, 11 km northeast of Eretria and 24 km east of the city of Chalcis. There are forests on the northern slopes while most of the mountain range is covered with grassland and bushes.

References

Mountains of Central Greece
Landforms of Euboea (regional unit)